Emily may refer to:

 Emily (given name), including a list of people with the name

Music 
 "Emily" (1964 song), title song by Johnny Mandel and Johnny Mercer to the film The Americanization of Emily
 "Emily" (Dave Koz song), a 1990 song on Dave Koz's album Dave Koz
 "Emily" (Bowling for Soup song), a 2003 song on Bowling for Soup's album Drunk Enough to Dance
 "Emily" (2009), song on Clan of Xymox's album In Love We Trust
 "Emily" (2019), song on Tourist's album Everyday
 "Emily", song on Adam Green's album Gemstones
 "Emily", song on Alice in Videoland's album Outrageous!
 "Emily", song on Elton John's album The One
 "Emily", song on Asian versions of Feeder's album Comfort in Sound
 "Emily", song on From First to Last's album Dear Diary, My Teen Angst Has a Bodycount
 "Emily", song on Kelly Jones' album Only the Names Have Been Changed
 "Emily", song on Joanna Newsom's album Ys
 "Emily", song on Manic Street Preachers' album Lifeblood
 "Emily", song on Michael W. Smith's album Go West Young Man
 "Emily", song on Mika's album The Origin of Love
 "Emily", song on The Mowgli's album Waiting for the Dawn
 "Emily", song on Since October's album This Is My Heart
 "Emily", song by Stephen Fretwell, on The Acoustic Album
 "Emily", song by Lower Than Atlantis's album Lower Than Atlantis
 Emily, an EP by Lower Than Atlantis
 Emily Records (later Emily Productions), founded by Anita O'Day

Television and film 
 Emily (TV series), French cartoon series
 Emily (The X-Files), two-part episode of The X-Files
 Emilie, English title of the Quebec TV series Les Filles de Caleb
 Emily (1976 film), a British film
 Emily (2022 film), a film about Emily Brontë
 "Emily" (Skins), an episode of the British teen drama Skins

Other uses 
 Emily (cow), a cow that escaped from a slaughterhouse and became a figurehead of animal rights
 E.M.I.L.Y., an artificial lifesaving machine that is helping to solve human crises. It's directed by a team of interdisciplinarily working humans.
Emily Chester, 1864, American novel 	
 Emily, Minnesota, USA
 H8K Emily Flying Boat, Allied identification code for the Japanese Kawanishi H8K flying boat
 Tropical Storm Emily (disambiguation), various tropical cyclones
 Emily Township, Ontario, Canada
 Emily (Thomas and Friends), a Thomas and Friends character based on a Stirling Single locomotive of the U.K.

See also 
 Amelia (disambiguation)
 Amélie, 2001 romantic comedy film
 Emilia (given name)
 Emilian (disambiguation)
 Emiliana (disambiguation)
 Émilie, a French feminine given name
 EMILY's List, political action committee in the United States
 Emly, a village in County Tipperary, Ireland